"Yo No Te Pido" ("I Do Not Ask of You") is a song written by Jorge Luís Piloto and performed by Puerto Rican salsa singer Gilberto Santa Rosa from his tenth studio album Esencia (1996). It was released as the second single from the album. In the song, the singer tells a woman he does not ask for too much and they can do it as friends. It became his second #1 hit on the Tropical Airplay chart. The track was recognized as one of the best-performing songs of the year on the Tropical/salsa field at the 1998 ASCAP Latin Awards.

Charts

Weekly charts

Year-end charts

See also
List of Billboard Tropical Airplay number ones of 1997

References

1996 songs
1997 singles
Gilberto Santa Rosa songs
Sony Discos singles
Spanish-language songs